Bagisara praecelsa is a moth of the family Noctuidae first described by Alexander Douglas Campbell Ferguson in 1997. It is found in southern North America from Texas and northern Mexico.

The wingspan is about 30 mm.

External links
"Review of the New World Bagisarinae with Description of Two New from the Southern United States (Noctuidae)".
Image

Bagisarinae
Moths described in 1997